Hervé Schneid (born 12 May 1956) is a French film editor, who has edited most of the films by Jean-Pierre Jeunet.  He won the 1992 César Award for Best Editing for his work on Delicatessen.

Selected filmography
 Europa (1991)
 Delicatessen (1991)
 Orlando (1992)
 The City of Lost Children (1995)
 ...à la campagne (1995)
 Alien: Resurrection (1997)
 East/West (1999)
 Amélie (2001)
 A Very Long Engagement (2004)
 Micmacs (2009)
 The Young and Prodigious Spivet (2013)
 One Wild Moment (2015)
 Return to Montauk (2017)

References

External links

French film editors
Living people
1956 births